Roberto Fernández Retamar (9 June 1930 – 20 July 2019, Havana) was a Cuban poet, essayist, literary critic and President of the Casa de las Américas. In his role as President of the organization, Fernández also served on the Council of State of Cuba. An early close confidant of Che Guevara and Fidel Castro, he was a central figure in Cuba from the 1959 Revolution until his death in 2019. Fernández also wrote over a dozen major collections of verse and founded the Casa de las Americas cultural magazine.

Professor Joao Cesar Castro de Rocha, at the University of Manchester has described Retamar as "one of the most distinguished Latin American intellectuals of the twentieth century." In 1989, he was awarded the National Prize for Literature, Cuba's national literary award and most important award of its type.

On Caliban
Responding to the arielismo of Jose Enrique Rodo, who used the Shakespeare created character Caliban as a metaphor for Latin American civilisation, Retamar in 1971 influentially set up instead Caliban as a symbol of the Cuban people, stating that: "Our symbol is not Ariel, as Rodó thought, but Caliban….I know no other metaphor more expressive of our cultural situation, of our reality".

Works
Poetry
    
    Elegía como un himno, Havana, 1950
    Patrias. 1949-1951, Havana, 1952
    Alabanzas, conversaciones. 1951-1955, Mexico, 1955
    Vuelta de la antigua esperanza, Havana, 1959
    En su lugar, la poesía, Havana, 1959
    Con las mismas manos. 1949-1962, Havana, 1962
    Historia antigua, Havana, 1964
    Poesía reunida. 1948-1965, Havana, 1966
    Buena suerte viviendo, Mexico, 1967
    Que veremos arder, havana, 1970. Published in Spain with the title Algo semejante a los monstruos antediluvianos
    A quien pueda interesar (Poesía 1958-1970), Mexico
    Cuaderno paralelo, Havana, 1973
    Circunstancia de poesía, Buenos Aires, 1974
    Revolución nuestra, amor nuestro, Havana, 1976
    Palabra de mi pueblo. Poesía 1949-1979, Havana, 1980
    Circunstancia y Juana, México, 1980 (consta de Circunstancia de poesía y Juana y otros poemas personales)
    Juana y otros poemas personales, Managua, 1981
    Poeta en La Habana, Barcelona, 1982
    Hacia la nueva, Havana, 1989
    Hemos construido una alegría olvidada. Poesías escogidas (1949-1988), Madrid, 1989
    Mi hija mayor va a Buenos Aires, Havana, 1993
    Algo semejante a los monstruos antediluvianos. Poesías escogidas 1949-1988, Havana, 1994
    Las cosas del corazón, Havana, 1994
    Una salva de porvenir, Matanzas, Cuba, 1995
    Aquí, Caracas, 1995
    Esta especie de poema. Antología poética, Puerto Rico, 1999
    Versos, Havana, 1999.
    Felices los normales. Poesías escogidas 1994-1999, Mexico, 2002.
    De una pluma de faisán. Poetas en mis poemas, Córdoba (Spain), 2004.
    Antología personal, Mexico, 2004.
    Nuestro fuego, Lima, 2006.
    Cinco poemas griegos, Havana, 2006.
    Lo que va dictando el fuego, Caracas, 2008.
    Conversa. Antoloxía 1951-1996, Vigo, 2009.
    Nosotros los sobrevivientes. Antología poética, Santiago de Chile, 2010.
    Vuelta de la antigua esperanza, Havana, 2010.
    Una salva de porvenir. Nueva antología personal, Buenos Aires, 2012.
    Circonstances de la poésie, París, 2014.
    Historia antigua, Havana, 2015.

Essay

    La poesía contemporánea en Cuba. 1927-1953, Havana, 1954
    Idea de la estilística, Havana, 1983
    Papelería, Universidad Central de Las Villas, 1962
    Ensayo de otro mundo, Havana, 1967
    Introducción a Cuba. Historia, Havana, 1968
    Calibán, Mexico, 1971
    El son de vuelo popular, Havana, 1972
    Lectura de Martí, Mexico, 1972
    Para una teoría de la literatura hispanoamericana, Havana, 1975
    Acerca de España. Contra la Leyenda Negra, Medellín, 1977
    Introducción a José Martí, Havana, 1978
    Algunos problemas teóricos de la literatura hispanoamericana, Cuenca, 1981
    Para el perfil definitivo del hombre (prólogo de Abel Prieto), Havana, 1981
    Entrevisto, Havana, 1982
    José Martí: semblanza biográfica y cronología mínima (con Ibrahím Hidalgo Paz), Havana, 1982
    Naturalidad y modernidad en la literatura martiana, Montevideo, 1986
    Algunos usos de civilización y barbarie, Buenos Aires, 1989
    Ante el Quinto Centenario, 1992
    José Martí. La encarnación de un pueblo, Buenos Aires, 1993
    Cuando un poeta muere, Matanzas, Cuba, 1994
    Nuestra América: cien años, y otros acercamientos a Martí, Havana, 1995
    Cuba defendida, Havana, 1996
    Recuerdo a, Havana, 1998
    La poesía, reino autónomo, Havana, 2000

See also
José Martí

References

Bibliography 
 ‘’Caliban and Other Essays’’ (Minneapolis 1989)
 Todo caliban San Juan, PR: Ediciones Callejon, 2002.

External links

Falleció el reconocido intelectual Roberto Fernández Retamar
Fallece en La Habana el poeta y ensayista Roberto Fernández Retamar
La Peña: Artists and Creators
World Literature Today Summer/Autumn 2002
1978 interview in Diacritics
1995 interview in Critical Inquiry

1930 births
2019 deaths
Latin Americanists
Government ministers of Cuba
20th-century Cuban poets
Cuban male poets
Cuban essayists
Male essayists
20th-century essayists
20th-century male writers